Superwolf is a 2005 collaborative studio album by Bonnie 'Prince' Billy and Matt Sweeney. It was released on Drag City.

Critical reception

At Metacritic, which assigns a weighted average score out of 100 to reviews from mainstream critics, the album received an average score of 80, based on 17 reviews, indicating "generally favorable reviews".

Pitchfork placed the album at number 21 on the "Top 50 Albums of 2005" list.

In 2007, Spin included Bonnie 'Prince' Billy and Matt Sweeney on the "Rock's 25 Greatest Team-ups" list.

Track listing

Personnel
Credits adapted from liner notes.

 Bonnie 'Prince' Billy – vocals, bass guitar, percussion, Nord Lead
 Matt Sweeney – vocals, guitar, bass guitar, Nord Lead
 Peter Townsend – drums
 Sue Schofield – vocals (on "My Home Is the Sea")

Charts

References

External links
 

2005 albums
Collaborative albums
Will Oldham albums
Drag City (record label) albums
Domino Recording Company albums